Cameraria fasciata is a moth of the family Gracillariidae. It is known from Pahang and Negeri Sembilan, Malaysia.

The wingspan is about 4.2 mm.

The larvae feed on Spatholobus species, including Spatholobus ferrugineus. They mine the leaves of their host plant. The mine has the form of an oblong, tentiform blotch-mine placed on the space between two lateral veins of the lower side of the leaf. The lower epidermis of the mining part is strongly contracted by silken threads, with a longitudinal wrinkle as in most species of Phyllonorycter. Pupation takes place within a whitish, ellipsoidal cocoon, which is placed inside the mine.

References

Cameraria (moth)

Leaf miners
Lepidoptera of Malaysia
Moths of Asia
Moths described in 1993
Taxa named by Tosio Kumata